Cribari is an Italian surname. Notable people with the surname include:

Fábio Eduardo Cribari (born 1975), known as "Binho", Brazilian footballer of Italian descent, brother of Emílson
Emílson Sánchez Cribari (born 1980), known as "Emílson Cribari" Brazilian footballer of Italian descent

Italian-language surnames